Kanika Palace (Odia: କନିକା ରାଜବାଟୀ) is situated near Rajkanika town. It is 125 km from Bhubaneswar. One of the floors has been converted into a museum. It is home to the world's biggest crocodile skeleton.

Famous Tourist Spots Nearby
 Aali Palace
 Bhitarkanika National Park
 Lakhmi Varaha Temple
 Akhandalamani Temple

See also

 Rajkanika
 Aali, Odisha
 Pattamundai
 Kendrapara

References

Palaces in Odisha